Stittville is a hamlet (and census-designated place) in the town of Marcy in Oneida County, New York, United States. Stittville has a post office with ZIP code 13469.

References

Hamlets in Oneida County, New York
Hamlets in New York (state)